Rohan Bewick is a former professional Australian rules footballer who played for the Brisbane Lions in the Australian Football League (AFL).

Bewick was recruited by the Lions from West Perth in the West Australian Football League (WAFL) a part of the trade deal that sent Jared Brennan to the Gold Coast Suns. He made his AFL debut in the opening round of the 2011 AFL season.

He is the son of former footballer Corry Bewick, who also played for West Perth, and the nephew of former Essendon player Darren Bewick. He has an identical twin brother Shaun who has played for South Fremantle and West Perth.

Bewick was delisted at the end of the 2018 season.

References

External links

Living people
1989 births
Brisbane Lions players
West Perth Football Club players
Australian rules footballers from Western Australia
Australian twins
Twin sportspeople